The Pennsylvania Railroad's class L6 comprised three electric locomotives of 2-8-2 wheel arrangement in the Whyte notation.  The intention was to build a whole class of freight boxcab locomotives using this design, but the displacement of class P5a to freight work after the introduction of the GG1 meant that there was little need for more electric freight locomotives.

Two L6 class locomotives were built at Altoona Works as prototypes in 1932. Numbered 7825–7826, they were renumbered 5938–5939 in 1933. Sixty production L6a locomotives were planned, with the car bodies of thirty subcontracted to  Lima Locomotive Works (order number 1128, construction numbers 7587–7616). One was completed as PRR 5940, while the other 29 car bodies remained in store at Altoona until scrapped in 1942 for the war effort. 

The 5939 and 5940 were renumbered 4790 and 4791 in 1966, with the 5938 scrapped the same year. The last two were scrapped in 1967.

References

 Train Misc NE Rails
 PRR Chronology 1937
 PRR Chronology 1968
 

Lima locomotives
L6
11 kV AC locomotives
Electric locomotives of the United States
1-D-1 locomotives
Standard gauge locomotives of the United States
Freight locomotives